Simon Coleman (born 13 June 1968) is an English former professional footballer who played as a defender. 

He notably played in the Premier League for Sheffield Wednesday and Bolton Wanderers and in the Football League for Mansfield Town, Middlesbrough, Derby County, Wolverhampton Wanderers, Southend United and Rochdale.

Playing career
He played 475 competitive games in English football and appeared in the Premier League for both Sheffield Wednesday and Bolton Wanderers. His career at Bolton may have reached greater heights in the Premier League had his leg not been broken in a tackle by Derby County's Marco Gabbiadini in February 1995.

Personal life
He has previously worked at a football academy in Mansfield. He now works at Garibaldi School

Honours
Zenith Data Systems Cup: Runner up 1989/90 with Middlesbrough
First Division Championship: 1996/97 (with Bolton Wanderers)

External links

1968 births
Living people
Footballers from Worksop
English footballers
Association football defenders
Premier League players
English Football League players
Mansfield Town F.C. players
Middlesbrough F.C. players
Derby County F.C. players
Sheffield Wednesday F.C. players
Bolton Wanderers F.C. players
Wolverhampton Wanderers F.C. players
Southend United F.C. players
Rochdale A.F.C. players